Tatra may refer to:

 Tatra Mountains, a mountain range in Slovakia and Poland
 Tatra County, an administrative division of Poland in the region of the Tatra Mountains
 Tatra National Park, Poland, a national park in Poland
 Tatra National Park, Slovakia, a national park in Slovakia
 Low Tatras, a mountain range in Slovakia
 "Tatra Tiger", the nickname for the economy of Slovakia during its high growth period since 1998
 Tatra (company), a car and truck manufacturer from the Czech Republic
 ČKD Tatra, a producer of trams from the Czech Republic
 Tatra, Estonia, a village in Tartu County, Estonia
 Tátra-class destroyer, a torpedo boat class of the Austro-Hungarian Navy
 Tatra pine vole, a species of vole
 FK Tatra Kisač, a football club in Serbia
 Tatra, a Czech brand of milk produced in Hlinsko
 Tatra, a Polish brand of beer produced by the Żywiec Brewery

See also
 Tatar (disambiguation)
 Tartar (disambiguation)